"Territory" is Sepultura's fifth official single, and the second of the three to be taken from the album Chaos A.D., released in 1993. Like most of the band's singles, the song is one of the band's best-known songs and remains a concert staple to this day.

The artwork for the single is not easily discernible. It depicts a monument of some sort. The image is overlaid with the band's thorned 'S' logo.

Releases
"Territory" saw relatively few variations upon its release compared to the other singles from the album. The CD came in a standard slimline jewel case, rather than the usual digipak, and only one version was released. The single was also released as a 12" vinyl record, with only "Polícia" as a B-side.

Music video
A music video was filmed for the single which features the band playing and walking through the desert, often daubed in Dead Sea mud, intercut with footage of slums and favelas and footage from Israel and the Palestinian territory: armed Israeli soldiers and policemen, pro-Palestinian graffiti, Bedouins, Haredim kissing the stones of the Western Wall, pages of the Qur'an and the Hebrew Bible and Christian ceremonies in the Old City of Jerusalem. It ends with a newspaper clip about the signing of the Oslo Accords and a walking soldier.

The video, directed by Paul Rachman, was released to TV stations in October 1993. It won the International Viewer's Choice award for best video (Brazil) at the 1994 MTV Video Music Awards. In 1995 it was released on the VHS Third World Chaos, which was re-released on DVD in 2002 as part of Chaos DVD.

Cover versions
American metal band Between the Buried and Me recorded a cover of this song, which is on their 2006 cover album The Anatomy Of.
French metal band Gojira covered "Territory" live during the tour promoting their 2016 album, Magma.

Track listing
"Territory" (from the album Chaos A.D.)
"Polícia" (Titãs cover, also available on digipak and Brazilian pressings of Chaos A.D. and the compilation Blood-Rooted)
"Biotech Is Godzilla" (from the album Chaos A.D.)

Personnel
Max Cavalera – lead vocals, rhythm guitar
Igor Cavalera – drums
Andreas Kisser – lead guitar
Paulo Jr. – bass
Produced by Andy Wallace and Sepultura
Recorded and engineered by Andy Wallace
Mixed by Andy Wallace
Assistant engineer: Simon Dawson

References

Sepultura songs
1993 singles
Israeli–Palestinian conflict in popular culture
Songs written by Max Cavalera
Songs written by Igor Cavalera
Songs written by Andreas Kisser
Songs written by Paulo Jr.
Anti-war songs
Protest songs
Roadrunner Records singles
Songs against racism and xenophobia
Songs about Israel
1992 songs